is a regional television broadcaster headquartered in Ōita, Ōita Prefecture, Japan that serves Ōita Prefecture. 

TOS is the second commercial television station in Ōita Prefecture. It was founded in 1969, and started on air on April 1, 1970.  When it was founded, TOS was affiliated with FNN, NNN and ANN. But now it affiliated with FNN and NNN.  Kansai Telecasting Corporation and Yomiuri Shimbun are the main shareholders of TOS. 

TOS started broadcasting digital terrestrial television on December 1, 2006.  Since 2014, TOS started to produce and broadcast its local news program .  On April 1, 2017, TOS signed a partnership agreement with Oita cable telecom (the biggest cable TV provider in Oita prefecture.

References

External links
Official site 

Television stations in Japan
Television channels and stations established in 1969